The 2001 North Dakota Fighting Sioux football team represented University of North Dakota in the 2001 NCAA Division II football season. The Fighting Sioux won the NCAA Division II national championship, the team's first. Their head coach was Dale Lennon, a former fullback for the school. The team's quarterback was junior Kelby Klosterman, who threw thirty-two touchdowns and seven interceptions. The leading rusher was Jed Perkerewicz, who rushed for almost eight-hundred yards and seven touchdowns. Three receivers had at least eight touchdowns; Dan Graf had ten, Jesse Smith had nine, and Luke Schleusner had eight. Mac Schneider, an American attorney and politician running to represent North Dakota’s at-large congressional district in the U.S. House of Representatives, was a starting offensive lineman for the team and served as team captain his senior year. The defense had a plus nineteen turnover margin and allowed fewer than thirteen points a game and just three rushing touchdowns all season. Eric Schmidt led the defense with ten sacks.

Schedule
North Dakota got off to a 6–0–0 start, before playing on October 24 to face the 6–0–0 UNO Mavericks of the University of Nebraska at Omaha.  The game was tied at the end of regulation, with UNO winning in overtime, 27–24, by the margin of a field goal.  The Omaha team lost 2 of its last 3 games, while the Sioux won all three of theirs, for the NCC title.

2001 NCAA Division II Playoffs
After finishing the season at 10–1–0 and winning the North Central Conference title, The University of North Dakota qualified for the playoffs as a home team.  The first-round game brought the Winona State Warriors to Grand Forks on November 17.  Kelby Klosterman threw six touchdown passes, tying the Division II playoff record.  The first two TDs were made from catches by John Kyvig, and the last four were to Jesse Smith, and the Sioux won 42–28.  Brian Wilhelmi also had one assisted tackle on the punt team to cap the victory.

The Pittsburg State Gorillas were the next team to visit Grand Forks, on November 24 for the quarterfinal round.  Cameron Peterka broke the NCAA playoff record with a 59-yard field goal at the close of the first half.  The Sioux held Pittsburg State to minus 17 (−17) yards rushing on their way to a 38–0 win.

The semifinal game on December 1 brought the UC-Davis Aggies to Grand Forks, and the Sioux had a 14–0 lead with 30 seconds left.  With UND on its own 3 yard line on fourth down, Coach Dale Lennon directed Klosterman to down the ball in the end zone for a safety, giving the Californians their only points in the 14–2 game.  North Dakota earned its first ever trip ever to the Division II championship game in Florence, Alabama, to face the Lakers of Michigan's Grand Valley State University.

Though UND had a 7–3 lead at the half, the Lakers took a 14–10 lead with 2:46 to play after Ryan Brady ran 12 yards for a touchdown.  The Sioux had the ball on their 20-yard line as the game was winding down.  Klosterman's first two passes were incomplete, and on third, he ran for yardage, but the Sioux were still 2 yards short on fourth down.  Klosterman gambled and ran seven yards to keep the drive alive.  Three downs later, the Sioux were at their 41-yard line, and it was fourth down again.  Gambling again, Klosterman completed a pass to Luke Schleusner to get the first down, but Schleusner eluded a tackler and, with the help of a block by Jesse Smith, made it to the one yard line.  With 29 seconds to play, Jed Perkerewicz took the handoff for the winning touchdown, giving the Sioux the 2001 Division II national championship.

Roster

References

North Dakota
North Dakota Fighting Hawks football seasons
NCAA Division II Football Champions
North Central Conference football champion seasons
North Dakota Fighting Sioux football